La Selle-sur-le-Bied is a commune in the Loiret department in north-central France. On 1 March 2019, the former commune Saint-Loup-de-Gonois was merged into La Selle-sur-le-Bied.

See also
Communes of the Loiret department

References

Sellesurlebied, La